Andukondan is a small village 30 km from Aruppukottai, Tamil Nadu, South India.

References 

Villages in Virudhunagar district